Are You Homeless? is an EP from The Jimi Homeless Experience.  It contains seven tracks of parody songs written by Jon Kinyon, each one lampooning a well known Jimi Hendrix hit.  The CD was officially released on August 23, 2007, the 40th anniversary of The Jimi Hendrix Experience's first LP, Are You Experienced.  The album cover itself is a parody of this influential album.

Production
Produced by Jon Kinyon
Recorded and engineered by Jeff Gross, June '07 - August '07 at Studio 144, Los Angeles, CA
Mixed by Jon Kinyon and Jeff Gross, August '07
Mastered by Michael Edmonds, August '07 at MK-ULTRA STUDIOS, Burbank, CA
Art design by Jon Kinyon
Graphics by Big Tasty

Studio musicians
 Josh Curtis -- vocals, bass guitar;
 Jason DeCorse -- guitar;
 Kevin Zelch -- drums.

Track listing
The track listing of parodies are as follows:

References

External links
 Official site
 Jimi Homeless Experience webcomic
 MK-ULTRA Records

2007 debut EPs
Jimi Hendrix tribute albums
The Jimi Homeless Experience albums
Comedy EPs
2000s comedy albums